In mathematics, the Frobenius determinant theorem was a conjecture made in 1896 by the mathematician Richard Dedekind, who wrote a letter to F. G. Frobenius about it (reproduced in , with an English translation in ).

If one takes the multiplication table of a finite group G and replaces each entry g with the variable xg, and subsequently takes the determinant, then the determinant factors as a product of n irreducible polynomials, where n is the number of conjugacy classes.  Moreover, each polynomial is raised to a power equal to its degree.  Frobenius proved this surprising conjecture, and it became known as the Frobenius determinant theorem.

Formal statement
Define the matrix  with entries . Then

 

References

  Review

 

Theorems in algebra
Determinants
Theorems in group theory
Matrix theory